Aeronáutica Agrícola Mexicana SA (AAMSA) was an aircraft manufacturing company in Mexico from 1971 to 1984.

History 
AAMSA was formed in 1971 as a joint venture between Rockwell International (30%) and Industrias Unidas SA (70%) to manufacture Rockwell's range of agricultural aircraft at a factory in Pasteje.

Products 
The company's most noteworthy product was the A9B-M Quail, a development of the CallAir A-9, which was produced until 1984. About 40 units were produced.

References

Multinational aircraft manufacturers
Aircraft manufacturers of Mexico
Manufacturing companies established in 1971
Joint ventures
Mexican companies established in 1971
Defunct manufacturing companies of Mexico